ICGS Sankalp is the first ship of her class. The vessel is classified as Advanced Offshore Patrol Vessels. She was built was Goa Shipyard Limited. and commissioned by A. K. Antony on 20 May 2008.

Construction
The keel of ship was laid on 17 July 2004 and launched on 28 April 2006. The ship was commissioned on 20 May 2008 by then Defence Minister A. K. Antony.

Operational history
In December 2014, Sankalp had undertaken a goodwill visit of 32 days to Singapore, Australia and Indonesia as part of international cooperation through exchange of information and bilateral exercises.

She has participated in many rescues, fire fighting missions.
 She has also deployed oversea in various countries such as Sri Lanka, Maldives, Oman, Qatar, Australia, Singapore.

See also

References

2008 ships
Ships of the Indian Coast Guard
Ships built in India